Shahniya (also Romanized as Shahnīyā; also known as Shahīnā, Shah Nīā, and Tahnā) is a village in Abkosh Rural District of Bord Khun District, Deyr County, Bushehr province, Iran. At the 2006 census, its population was 1,330 in 276 households. The following census in 2011 counted 1,816 people in 464 households. The latest census in 2016 showed a population of 2,070 people in 567 households; it was the largest village in its rural district.

References 

Populated places in Deyr County